Babakücə or Babaküçə or Babakucha may refer to:

Babakücə, Azerbaijan
Babaküçə, Azerbaijan